In religion and esotericism, the term "physical universe" or "material universe" is used to distinguish the physical matter of the universe from a proposed spiritual or supernatural essence. In philosophy, it is useful to posit the existence of a metaphysical world, the so called Platonic world of Forms, where abstract idealized objects such as circles and lines exist, in contrast to the material or physical world.

In the Book of Veles, and perhaps in traditional Slavic mythology, the physical universe is referred to as Yav. Gnosticism holds that the physical universe was created by a Demiurge. In Dharmic religions Maya is believed to be the illusion of a physical universe.

Physicalism, a type of monism, holds that only physical things exist. This is also known as metaphysical naturalism.

See also
Universe

Physical cosmology
Spirituality